The Recursive Largest First (RLF) algorithm is a heuristic for the NP-hard graph coloring problem. It was originally proposed by Frank Leighton in 1979.

The RLF algorithm assigns colors to a graph’s vertices by constructing each color class one at a time. It does this by identifying a maximal independent set of vertices in the graph, assigning these to the same color, and then removing these vertices from the graph. These actions are repeated on the remaining subgraph until no vertices remain. 

To form high-quality solutions (solutions using few colors), the RLF algorithm uses specialized heuristic rules to try to identify "good quality" independent sets. These heuristics make the RLF algorithm exact for bipartite, cycle, and wheel graphs. In general, however, the algorithm is approximate and may well return solutions that use more colors than the graph’s chromatic number.

Description
The algorithm can be described by the following three steps. At the end of this process,  gives a partition of the vertices representing a feasible -colouring of the graph .

 Let  be an empty solution. Also, let  be the graph we wish to color, comprising a vertex set  and an edge set .
 Identify a maximal independent set . To do this:
 The first vertex added to  should be the vertex in  that has the largest number of neighbors.
If  still contains vertices, then return to Step 2; otherwise end.

Example

Consider the graph  shown on the right. This is a wheel graph and will therefore be optimally colored by RLF. Executing the algorithm results in the vertices being selected and colored in the following order: 

	Vertex  (color 1)

This gives the final three-colored solution .

Performance
Let  be the number of vertices in the graph and let  be the number of edges. Using big O notation, in his original publication Leighton states the complexity of RLF to be ; however, this can be improved upon. Much of the expense of this algorithm is due to Step 2, where vertex selection is made according to the heuristic rules stated above. Indeed, each time a vertex is selected for addition to the independent set , information regarding the neighbors needs to be recalculated for each uncolored vertex.

It will also now be inexact for bipartite, cycle, and wheel graphs.

In an empirical comparison by Lewis in 2021, RLF was shown to produce significantly better vertex colorings than alternative heuristics such as the  greedy algorithm and the  DSatur algorithm on random graphs. However, runtimes with RLF were also seen to be higher than these alternatives due to its higher overall complexity.

References

External links
 High-Performance Graph Colouring Algorithms Suite of graph coloring algorithms (implemented in C++) used in the book A Guide to Graph Colouring: Algorithms and Applications (Springer International Publishers, 2021).

1979 in computing
Graph algorithms
Graph coloring